Thomas Damgaard (born 17 June 1971) is a Danish former professional boxer who competed from 1998 to 2007. He held the European super-lightweight title from 1998 to 1999, and the European welterweight title in 2000.

Professional career
Damgaard made his professional debut on 13 February 1998, scoring a fifth-round knockout against Antonio Gallegos. In only his tenth fight, nine months later on 27 November, Damgaard won the vacant European super-lightweight title by stopping Jose Manuel Berdonce in the twelfth and final round. He would make two defences, against Khalid Rahilou on 16 April 1999 (fourth-round knockout) and Miguel Angel Pena on 1 October 1999 (seventh-round stoppage). On 3 November 2000, Damgaard won the European welterweight title in a split decision over Alessandro Duran. No defences were made, but Damgaard continued to spend the next five years undefeated, fighting exclusively in Denmark.

On 28 January 2006, Damgaard travelled abroad for the first time to face established veteran Arturo Gatti in the United States. A fan-friendly slugfest was the result, at the end of which Damgaard was stopped on his feet in eleven rounds after trailing on all three judges' scorecards. It would prove to be the penultimate fight in Damgaard's career, and the third-last for Gatti. Both would retire from boxing in 2007.

Professional boxing record

References

1971 births
Living people
Light-welterweight boxers
Welterweight boxers
Danish male boxers
European Boxing Union champions
People from Kalundborg
Sportspeople from Region Zealand